The Cascade (Kaskad) is a giant stairway made of limestone in Yerevan, Armenia. It links the downtown Kentron area of Yerevan with the Monument neighborhood (Arabkir and Kanaker-Zeytun districts). Designed by architects Jim Torosyan, Aslan Mkhitaryan, and Sargis Gurzadyan the construction of the cascade started in 1971 and was partially completed in 1980.

Inside the Cascade, underneath the exterior steps, are seven escalators that rise along the length of the complex. There are also exhibit halls connected to some of the landings along the escalators which compose the Cafesjian Museum of Art.

The exterior of The Cascade features multiple levels adorned with fountains and modernist sculptures from the Cafesjian collection. The stairs afford walkers unobstructed views of central Yerevan and Mount Ararat. At the base of the Cascade is a garden courtyard with statues by contemporary sculptors such as Botero, Lynn Chadwick, and Barry Flanagan. 

There are a number of cafes and restaurants on both sides of the Cascade frequented by locals and tourists. Classical and jazz concerts often take place at the Cascade during spring, summer and early autumn, with spectators sitting on the steps.

History

Construction began in 1971 during the Soviet era. The first phase was completed in 1980. The second phase began in earnest in 2002 and lasted until 2009. The complex was handed over to the American-Armenian magnate and collector Gerard Cafesjian in the early 2000s during which the complex underwent further renovation. A large museum complex is planned at the zenith but remains stalled and is still in the early stages of construction.

Gallery

See also
Cafesjian Museum of Art
Potemkin Stairs

References

Cafesjian Center for the Arts
About Yerevan Cascade

Buildings and structures in Yerevan
Stairways
Tourist attractions in Yerevan
Mount Ararat